Cod Creek is a  long 2nd tributary to the Nanticoke River in Sussex County, Delaware.

Course
Cod Creek rises about 1 mile northeast of Columbia, Delaware and then flows northwest into the Nanticoke River about 0.75 miles northeast of Sharptown, Maryland.

Watershed
Cod Creek drains  of area, receives about 44.4 in/year of precipitation, has a topographic wetness index of 654.93 and is about 11% forested.

See also
List of Delaware rivers

References

Rivers of Delaware
Rivers of Sussex County, Delaware
Tributaries of the Nanticoke River